Stanley C. Mercer (24 December 1903 – 17 October 1973) was a British diver. He competed in the men's 3 metre springboard event at the 1928 Summer Olympics.

References

External links
 

1903 births
1973 deaths
British male divers
Olympic divers of Great Britain
Divers at the 1928 Summer Olympics
Place of birth missing